The 2012–13 Umaglesi Liga was the 24th season of top-tier football in Georgia. The season began on 10 August 2012 and ended on 19 May 2013.

Teams

Stadiums and locations
Dinamo Batumi play their home matches in Kobuleti and WIT Georgia in Mtskheta.

First phase
The league began with a regular double-round robin schedule on 8 August 2012. The best six teams qualified for the championship round, which will determine the Georgian champions and the participants for the 2013–14 European competitions. The remaining six teams play in the relegation group, where the top four free will secure places in the 2013–14 competition.

League table

Results

Second phase
This phase began on 9 March 2013 and will end on 18 May 2013.

Championship round
Dinamo Tbilisi, Dila Gori, Torpedo Kutaisi, Chikhura Sachkhere, Zestafoni and Baia Zugdidi ended the first phase in the top six positions of the table and thus entered the championship round.

The results of the matches among these teams will be used as a base ranking. Each team will then play another double round-robin schedule against every other team.

Table

Results

Relegation round
Metalurgi Rustavi, Merani Martvili, WIT Georgia, Sioni Bolnisi, Dinamo Batumi and Kolkheti Poti and  finished seventh through twelfth and thus entered the promotion/relegation round.

Each team will play another double round-robin schedule against every other team. The last two teams of this round will play in the Pirveli Liga in the 2013–14 season.

Table

Results

See also
 2012–13 Georgian Cup

External links
  

Erovnuli Liga seasons
1
Georgia